Ain Aouda is a city in Morocco, situated in the suburban area of Rabat. According to the 2004 census, the city had a population of 25,105 people.

The city is rumored to house a detention centre of the Moroccan secret services, known as the DST (Direction de surveillance du Térritoire).

See also
Rabat
Temara

References

Populated places in Rabat-Salé-Kénitra
Torture in Morocco